Maha Badmaash is a 1977 Bollywood film directed by R.G. Thaker.

Plot
Ratan runs a legitimate casino, little knowing that he is under surveillance by an international gangster named Mogambha, who is unseen, but heard only. When Ratan is approached and asked to partner with Mogambha, he refuses, and is implicated in a murder of a man named Mombha. Thus entrapped, he agrees to be part of Mogambha's gang and is asked to work together with Pinky Nathani and Mike. Subsequently, Ratan is asked to kill Ajit Saxena, the Commissioner of Police, which he refuses to do. Mogambho's men then abduct his Secretary, Reddy, and his sister, Mala, and hold them for ransom until such time Ratan assassinates Ajit. Will Ratan commit this felony, or refuse at the risk of losing Reddy and Mala.

Cast
Vinod Khanna as Ratan
Neetu Singh as Seema / Pinky (Double Role)
Bindu as Reena
Brahmachari as Reddy 
Imtiaz Khan as Mike
Pinchoo Kapoor as Dindayal     
Praveen Paul as Mrs. Nathani 
Om Shivpuri as Mogambo / Parker

Music

Trivia

The movie had average business. The music score was by Ravindra Jain. This film contains 3 songs, all sung by Asha Bhosle (including 1 duet song with Mohammed Rafi). The film comprises comedy, action, drama and romance.

The Don MOGAMBO was originally cast as a villain, which was again acted by Amrish Puri in Mr. India.

References

External links
 

1977 films
1970s Hindi-language films
Films scored by Ravindra Jain